Barbour's map turtle (Graptemys barbouri) is a species of turtle in the family Emydidae. The species is native to the southeastern United States.

Geographic range
G. barbouri is found in rivers located in southeastern Alabama, the western panhandle of Florida, and southwestern Georgia.

Etymology
The specific name or epithet, barbouri, is in honor of American herpetologist Thomas Barbour.

Ownership
Owning Barbour's map turtle is illegal in Georgia, Michigan, and Alabama. The limit is two turtles per person in Florida. Like all map turtles, it is under the protection of the Salmonellosis Four-inch Regulation, disallowing G. barbouri to be sold if it is under the length of 4 in (10 cm).

Description
Adult male Barbour's map turtles are on average 3.5 to 5.5 in (9–14 cm) in straight-line carapace length. Adult females are much larger  and can vary from 6 to 12.5 in (15 – 32 cm) in straight-line carapace length. "Females attain really imposing dimensions, and their heads are enormously enlarged". G. barbouri possesses black-tipped spines on the second, third, and fourth vertebral scutes. These spines are very noticeable in males, and resemble a dorsal fin.

Diet
Barbour's map turtle mainly consumes mollusks, insects, and small fish found in rivers.

References

Further reading
Behler JL, King FW (1979). The Audubon Society Field Guide to North American Reptiles and Amphibians. New York: Alfred A. Knopf. 743 pp., 657 plates. . (Graptemys barbouri, pp. 458–459 + Plate 283).
Carr A, Marchand LJ (1942). "A new turtle from the Chipola River, Florida". Proc. New England Zool. Club 20: 95-100. (Graptemys barbouri, new species).
Powell R, Conant R, Collins JT (2016). Peterson Field Guide to Reptiles and Amphibians of Eastern and Central North America, Fourth Edition. Boston and New York: Houghton Mifflin Harcourt. xiv + 494 pp., 47 plates, 207 figures. . (Graptemys barbouri, pp. 202–203 + Plates 16, 21 + Figures 82, 92 + photo on page x).
Smith HM, Brodie ED Jr (1982). Reptiles of North America: A Guide to Field Identification. New York: Golden Press. 240 pp.  (paperback). (Graptemys barbouri, pp. 52–53).

External links
Tortoise and Freshwater Turtle Specialist Group (1996).  Graptemys barbouri.   2006 IUCN Red List of Threatened Species.   Retrieved 29 July 2007.
Alabama Department of Conservation and Natural Resources .

Reptiles of the United States
barbouri
Reptiles described in 1942
Taxa named by Archie Carr
Taxonomy articles created by Polbot